Fatal Frame: Mask of the Lunar Eclipse is a survival horror video game developed by Tecmo, Nintendo SPD and Grasshopper Manufacture. The fourth installment in the Fatal Frame series and the first on a Nintendo console, it was released in 2008 by Nintendo for the Wii in Japan. A remaster for eighth and ninth generation consoles and Windows published by Koei Tecmo was released worldwide in 2023.

The story, set on the fictional Rougetsu Island, focuses on Ruka Minazuki, one of a group of girls who was held captive on the island for unknown reasons. Years after their rescue, still suffering from amnesia, Ruka and the two surviving girls return to the island to seek out the truth. The game's title stems from a ritual mask key to the story. The gameplay, as with previous entries in the series, revolves around the main character exploring environments and tackling hostile ghosts using the Camera Obscura.

The idea for Mask of the Lunar Eclipse came to series co-creator Keisuke Kikuchi when he first saw the Wii hardware. Kikuchi and series co-creator Makoto Shibata returned as respective producer and director, while Grasshopper Manufacture's Goichi Suda acted as co-director, co-writer and designer. The gameplay concept was making the player literally feel the fear evoked in the game. The addition of further developers to the project enabled the team to reconsider the standard formula, although it proved to be a chaotic experience. As with previous games, the theme songs were sung by Tsuki Amano. When released, the Wii original became the best-selling entry in the series to that date, and received generally positive reviews from critics.

Gameplay

Fatal Frame: Mask of the Lunar Eclipse is a survival horror video game that has players taking control of four different characters navigating a variety of different environments, including traditional Japanese houses and a Meiji-era sanatorium-turned-hotel, while facing hostile ghosts through photography using the series' recurring Camera Obscura Third-person navigation and first-person control of in-game weapons such as the Camera Obscura are controlled using the Wii Remote and Nuchuck. During exploration, the characters are regularly attacked by hostile spirits, who take away the characters' health through touch.

The two central characters can fight off and defeat spirits using the Camera Obscura. Shots taken by the Camera Obscura deal varying amounts of damage based on how close the ghost is, the angle of the shot, and the film used. These factors are taken together to determine how many points the player is awarded for a shot. The most damaging type of shot is the "Fatal Frame", which is achieved if a shot is taken when the ghost is attacking. Points are used as the in-game currency, which can be used at save points to purchase items such as medicine and other items. Blue gems scattered around the environment can be used to upgrade the Camera Obscura, with some upgrades speeding reload time or enabling shots to deal more damage. Types of film range from an unlimited low-quality film that deals little damage to rarer and more powerful film types.

In addition to the Camera Obscura, the character can use a flashlight to explore their surroundings, and one character has access to a special Spirit Flashlight, which uses moonlight to pacify spirits. Should a ghost attack, gestures with the Wii Remote can shake them off. The "New Game+" mode unlocks additional costumes and further items and upgrades, many of them dependent on how much the player has scored during the initial playthrough. On higher difficulties, the number of items available is reduced.

Synopsis
In 1970, ten years prior to the start of the game, suspected serial killer Yō Haibara kidnapped five girls from their rooms in a sanatorium on Rougetsu, an island south of Honshu. The girls were rescued from a cavern beneath the sanatorium by detective Chōshirō Kirishima, who had been pursuing Haibara, but they had all lost their memories. Two years later, a catastrophe strikes Rougetsu Island which kills off the inhabitants. Eight years later, in the present, two of the rescued girls have died in mysterious circumstances and two of the survivors, Misaki Asō and Madoka Tsukimori, return to discover the truth about their pasts. Despite being warned by her mother not to return to the island, fellow survivor Ruka Minazuki goes there to find Misaki and Madoka. Shortly before Ruka's arrival, Madoka is killed by hostile spirits.

Chōshirō, the detective who rescued them, also returns to the island to both find Ruka and continue his pursuit of Haibara. During her exploration, Ruka learns that she and Misaki are suffering from a supernatural disease dubbed Moonlight Syndrome, which affects their memories and identity and is spread by touch and vision. Each character also collects pieces of a mask used in a local ritual dance to guide souls into the afterlife. During the course of the story, it is revealed that Misaki arranged their return to the island so their illness might be cured, and that Chōshirō himself died ten years before, and is now helping the girls guided by the benevolent spirit of Ruka's mother Sayaka.

It is gradually revealed that Ruka's father Soya Yomotsuki had become obsessed with completing the ritual dance, as it would also cure the disease and required the construction of a special mask for the dancer. Ruka herself became infected, and was treated at the sanatorium along with the other girls and the dancer, Haibara's sister Sakuya. The ritual was a catastrophic failure due to another tourist version of the ritual taking place concurrently; Sakuya reached the final stage of the disease and fell into a coma when the mask shattered, the other girls collapsed and had their memories wiped, and the dancers in the tourist ritual all died. Two years after Misaki and Madoka left the island with Ruka, Sakuya woke up and infected the whole island, killing everyone who saw her face including Yomotsuki.

To lay Sakuya to rest and calm Rougetsu's dead inhabitants, the ritual must be completed, and for that the mask must be restored. Ruka comes into possession of all the mask fragments, which reform into the complete Mask of the Lunar Eclipse. Confronting Sakuya atop Rougetsu's lighthouse, she manages to pacify her with a sacred tune called "Tsukimori" taught to her by Sayaka, then Chōshirō puts the mask on Sakuya, completing the ritual and allowing all the island's spirits to pass into the afterlife including Sakuya, Chōshirō and Yomotsuki. Depending on the game's difficulty setting, Misaki's fate is either left unknown, or her illness is cured after she is saved by Madoka's spirit and she leaves the island with Ruka.

Development
Mask of the Lunar Eclipse was co-developed by Tecmo, Grasshopper Manufacture and Nintendo Software Planning & Development. Tecmo was in charge of the gameplay and atmosphere, Grasshopper Manufacture were put in charge of character motion and other unspecified aspects of development, while Nintendo managed general production. Makoto Shibata and Keisuke Kikuchi, series creators and respective director and producer of the previous games in the series, returned to their respective posts. In addition, Grasshopper Manufacture's Goichi Suda acted as a co-director, co-writer and designer. Suda was initially reluctant to work on the project due to his intense dislike for ghosts and horror games. According to a later interview with Kikuchi, he was first inspired when he saw the potential in the Wii hardware, and was the first to propose the project to Nintendo. The main development goal for Mask of the Lunar Eclipse was "feeling fear with [the player's] body", with gameplay functions closely tied into the Wii hardware. Among these were feeding sounds through the Wii remote's speaker and creating effects using the rumble function. An adjustment they made was to the camera perspective: while it had been placed at a distance in previous games, it was shifted to an over-the-shoulder third-person view so the control of the torch was more realistic. This raised concerns as to the pace of the character's movement. Taking into account similar criticisms from fans of earlier games, the characters' speed was increased. This aspect was undergoing revision until quite late into development. The CGI scenes were created by Shirogumi.

When designing the game's main setting, the team moved away from the traditional enclosed Japanese mansions from previous games in favor of somewhere that blended Eastern and Western architectural tastes to create different gameplay opportunities, described in-game as a Meiji-era hotel. Traditional mansion settings were also included, with more locations being present than in previous games. The color yellow was chosen as the game's image color, while the key words used to describe the plot were "memory", "moon" and "mask". The subtitle refers to the mask that is key to the Kagura Dance Ritual. The mask in turn tied into story themes of the phases of the moon, the nature of memory, and music. During development, Shibata and Kikuchi felt that Grasshopper and Nintendo's involvement helped them reevaluate the series formula and try out new things. After development, Kikuchi said that the three companies' varying ideas on the project made the development "a complete and utter mess", though it ultimately worked out well. The characters were designed by Sawaki Takeyasu, who had previously worked in that capacity on Ōkami. The music was composed by Masafumi Takada and Etsuko Ichikawa. As with the previous two games, Mask of the Lunar Eclipse features songs by Japanese singer Tsuki Amano: the theme song "Zero Tuning", and the ending theme "Noise".

Release
Mask of the Lunar Eclipse was first revealed in January 2008 at a Tecmo press conference. It was the first series title to be developed and released for a Nintendo console. It was released on July 31. Its release was timed to coincide with a traditional time in Japan for people to tell each other ghost stories. Upon release, the game featured several bugs affecting player progress through the game, as revealed in a message to fans from Nintendo. While no North American release was planned, a European release was in the works and was briefly outed by a French gaming magazine. After the leak, Nintendo stated that a European release had been planned, but since then the localization had been cancelled. In addition to Nintendo, no other third-party publisher would publish the game overseas, leaving Mask of the Lunar Eclipse as a Japan-exclusive title at that time.

After Nintendo's announcement, a three-person team decided to create a fan translation of the game. The development process was compared by them to "a Frankenstein's monster", referring to how they needed to assess the data, construct a development schedule for the translation patch, going through theories about file structure, then creating a tool to access the game's data files. The modification program was then tested on Super Smash Bros. Brawl by a dedicated tester, then sent back for refinement. They worked hard to preserve the atmosphere of the original game, along with attempting to make the translation as true as possible without being overly verbose. To help translate the text, they posted the script in segments on internet forums, then later restricted access to the work due to quality concerns. During this time, they found several competent translators who were able to do the final 20% of script translation. It took several months for the entire process of extracting text, translation, then patching in the translated text to be completed. The patch ended up being quite large as the game designers had split the game into hundreds of different data archives and suitable accommodations and adjustments needed to be made for this. The fan translation was released on January 19, 2010. The patch was designed to work on any Wii device, bypassing the console's region locking, and included a newly made costume for the main character.

Prior to any Western release, the game was commonly dubbed "Fatal Frame / Project Zero IV" or "Fatal Frame / Project Zero: Mask of the Lunar Eclipse" by journalists. A Western release was eventually announced in September 2022. Released for Nintendo Switch, PlayStation 4, PlayStation 5, Windows, Xbox One and Xbox Series X/S, this version is a remaster that includes updated graphics and new unlockable costumes. As with earlier releases, the game was given the title Fatal Frame in North America, and Project Zero in Europe. The remaster and worldwide release was inspired by the success of a remaster of the fifth Fatal Frame title Maiden of Black Water in 2021. The game was released on March 9, 2023; worldwide the game was released as a digital exclusive, while in Japan the PS4 and Switch versions received a physical and digital release. The release included a standard edition, and a Digital Deluxe Edition which included a digital artbook and soundtrack. Pre-orders include in-game costumes, while another in-game item is unlocked if players have save data from Maiden of Black Water. Details on its localized settings and characters were released in December 2022.

Reception

Fatal Frame: Mask of the Lunar Eclipse received "mixed or average" reviews, according to review aggregator Metacritic.

During its debut, Mask of the Lunar Eclipse sold approximately 30,000 units, making one of the weaker debuts of the series. As of the end of December 2008, the game had sold nearly 75,000 units. While these were low sales compared to other Wii titles, it made Mask of the Lunar Eclipse the best-selling title in the series to that date.

The reviewers for Famitsu were united in their opinion that, while not a revolutionary title within the series, it was a high-quality game. Eurogamers Kristan Reed regularly noted its similarity to previous entries in the series, praising the atmosphere and gameplay, while criticizing the control scheme and its negative effect on combat and navigation. In a preview of the game, Richard Eisenbeis of Kotaku praised the game's multiple storylines and settings, but was mixed about its familiar gameplay and again criticized the controls. In closing, he generally cited it as a good entry in the series. Matthew Blundon of Nintendo Life, echoing the criticism of the controls, said that it would please hardcore horror game players. Albert Lichi of Cubed3 again faulted the control set up. In most other respects he was highly positive, praising the story, combat and graphics, calling it a "labor of love" on the part of the development team. In its import review, Edge Magazine generally enjoyed the unsettling atmosphere that the developers had succeeded in creating by using the dark settings and close-set camera angle. The reviewer also defended the often-criticized control scheme, saying that it added to the feeling of fear. In closing, the reviewer said that the subtlety of the game showed the flaws in other horror franchises such as Silent Hill.

Notes

References

External links

 
 
  

2008 video games
2000s horror video games
Fatal Frame games
Grasshopper Manufacture games
Hospitals in fiction
Koei Tecmo games
Music in fiction
Nintendo games
Nintendo Switch games
PlayStation 4 games
PlayStation 5 games
Psychological horror games
Fiction about sacrifices
Single-player video games
Video game prequels
Video games about amnesia
Video games about curses
Video games developed in Japan
Video games directed by Goichi Suda
Video games scored by Masafumi Takada
Video games set in 1970
Video games set in 1980
Video games set on fictional islands
Wii games
Windows games
Xbox One games
Xbox Series X and Series S games

de:Project Zero#Zero: Tsukihami no Kamen
ja:零 (ゲーム)#零 月蝕の仮面